John Bradbury (31 March 1941 – 23 July 2020) was an Australian rules footballer who played with Footscray in the Victorian Football League (VFL).

Notes

External links 		
	
	

Australian rules footballers from Victoria (Australia)
Western Bulldogs players
Sunshine Football Club (VFA) players
1941 births
2020 deaths